Francis O'Connor may refer to:

Francisco Burdett O'Connor (Francis O'Connor, 1791–1871), officer in the Irish Legion of Simón Bolívar's army in Venezuela
Francis P. O'Connor (1927–2007), associate judge of the Massachusetts Supreme Judicial Court
Francis V. O'Connor (1937–2017), American art historian

See also
Frank O'Connor (disambiguation)
Frances O'Connor (born 1967), English-born Australian actress
Frances O'Connor (performer) (1914–1982), American entertainer